Iran competed at the 1960 Summer Olympics in Rome, Italy. 25 athletes represented Iran in the 1960 Olympics.

Competitors

Medal summary

Medal table

Medalists

Results by event

Athletics 

Men

Boxing 

Men

Shooting 

Open

Weightlifting 

Men

Wrestling 

Men's freestyle

Men's Greco-Roman

References

External links
Official Olympic Reports
International Olympic Committee results database

Nations at the 1960 Summer Olympics
1960
Summer Olympics
Pahlavi Iran